Soumya Guguloth (born 18 July 2001) is an Indian women's international footballer who plays as a midfielder for Croatian club Dinamo Zagreb and the India women's national football team.

Club career
Soumya has played for Kenkre in Indian Women's League, before signing with Gokulam Kerala in 2021. She also participated in 2021 AFC Women's Club Championship, where they sealed their third place.

On July 13, 2022, it was announced that she, along with Jyoti Chauhan, have been invited to give trials at the Prva hrvatska nogometna liga za žene side ŽNK Dinamo Zagreb. They were selected by the club's assistant coach, Mia Medvedoski, when she attended the "Sports Elite Trials" held from 6–11 June in Kolkata. On 1 September, she was signed by the club.

International career
After representing India at various youth international levels, Soumya made her senior debut for the national team on 8 April 2021 in a 0–1 friendly away loss to Uzbekistan. On 7 September 2022, at the SAFF Women's Championship in Nepal, she scored her first international goal against Pakistan in their 3–0 win. Later on 10 September, she again scored a goal against the Maldives as they clinched a 9–0 victory.

International goals

Honours
Gokulam Kerala
Indian Women's League: 2021–22
AFC Women's Club Championship: third place 2021

See also 

List of Indian football players in foreign leagues

References

External links
 Soumya Guguloth at All India Football Federation

2001 births
Living people
People from Nizamabad district
Sportswomen from Telangana
Footballers from Telangana
Indian women's footballers
Women's association football midfielders
India women's international footballers
India women's youth international footballers
Gokulam Kerala FC Women players
ŽNK Dinamo Zagreb players
Indian Women's League players
Indian expatriate women's footballers
Expatriate women's footballers in Croatia